The Roman Catholic Diocese of Whitehorse is a Latin Church ecclesiastical territory or diocese of the Catholic Church that includes Yukon and the northern portion of British Columbia north of latitude 57 degrees. 

As of 2003, the diocese contains 23 parishes, 4 active diocesan priests, 9 religious priests, and 9,000 Catholics.  It also has 8 women religious, 10 religious brothers, and 1 permanent deacon. The Diocese of Whitehorse is a suffragan diocese in the ecclesiastical province of the metropolitan Archdiocese of Grouard-McLennan.

Bishops

Diocesan bishops
The following is a list of the vicars apostolic and bishops of Whitehorse, and their terms of service:
Émile-Marie Bunoz, O.M.I. (1908-1944, appointed Vicar Apostolic of Prince Rupert, British Columbia
Jean-Louis-Antoine-Joseph Coudert, O.M.I. (1944-1965)
James Philip Mulvihill (1965-1967 as Vicar Apostolic; 1967–1971)
Hubert Patrick O'Connor (1971-1986), appointed Bishop of Prince George, British Columbia
Thomas Joseph Lobsinger (1987-2000)
Gary Gordon (2006-2014), appointed Bishop of Victoria, British Columbia
Hector Vila (2015-present)

Coadjutor bishop
 Jean-Louis-Antoine-Joseph Coudert, O.M.I. (1936-1944), as Coadjutor Vicar Apostolic

References
Diocese of Whitehorse page at catholichierarchy.org retrieved July 14, 2006

Whitehorse
Christianity in Yukon
Catholic Church in Yukon